For the divisional competitions, see: 2012 Asian Five Nations division tournaments

The 2012 Asian Five Nations, known as the 2012 HSBC Asian 5 Nations due to the tournament's sponsorship by the HSBC, was the 5th series of the Asian Five Nations rugby union tournament.

Japan secured their 5th Asian Five Nations title, 20th overall Asian title, winning all four of their games.

Changes from 2011
 Sri Lanka has been replaced with South Korea, who earns promotion from Division 1.

Teams
The teams involved are:

Final Table

Points are awarded to the teams as follows:

Fixtures

References

External links
Official Website
ARFU

Asian
2012
Five Nations
Five Nations
2012 in South Korean sport
2012 in Hong Kong sport
2012 in Kazakhstani sport
2012 in Emirati sport